On November 2, 2018, a mass shooting occurred at Tallahassee Hot Yoga, a yoga studio located in Tallahassee, Florida. The gunman, identified as Scott Paul Beierle, shot six women, two of them fatally, and pistol-whipped a man before killing himself.

Criminal investigators attested to the attacker's hatred of women. The US Secret Service and International Centre for Counter-Terrorism consider the attack an act of misogynist terrorism.

Shooting 
Scott Paul Beierle entered the hot yoga studio at 5:37 p.m. EDT on November 2, 2018, shooting six people, resulting in the deaths of two women, Maura Binkley, 21, and Dr. Nancy Van Vessem, 61. Officers responded to reports of gunfire within three and a half minutes, at which point the perpetrator was found deceased. Partygoers in a bar across the street told reporters how they witnessed people fleeing from the studio and that a man in a bloody white T-shirt who ran into the bar claimed to have charged the shooter only to be pistol whipped. This claim was later backed up in interviews with survivors who stated that the male customer used a vacuum cleaner and then a broomstick to attack Beierle, which gave other students time to escape. Tallahassee Police Chief Michael DeLeo also credited the students who "fought back and tried not only to save themselves but other people".

The yoga studio was a part of a plaza that is occupied by restaurants and other businesses. Those eating at the restaurant underneath the studio heard the gunshots and told reporters that the owner came through the dining area shortly after, asking if anyone was a doctor.

Victims 
When officers arrived, it was discovered that six people had been shot during the attack. Two victims, Maura Binkley and Nancy Van Vessem, were deceased at the scene. Maura Binkley, age 21, was a student at Florida State University, and due to graduate in 2019. Dr. Nancy Van Vessem, age 61, was a doctor and the chief medical director for Capital Health Plan. She was also a faculty member at Florida State.

Perpetrator 
Scott Paul Beierle (October 6, 1978 – November 2, 2018) was later revealed as the perpetrator by police. According to his social media profiles on Facebook and LinkedIn, Beierle was a military veteran and former teacher for the Anne Arundel County Public School System in Maryland, teaching both English and social studies at Meade High School and being affiliated with conservative groups FSU College Republicans and We Are Conservatives. Additionally, Beierle has also taught at numerous other schools as a substitute teacher, yet only briefly due to performance issues and inappropriate behavior. In one instance, Beierle was fired for an incident where he reportedly asked a female student if she was "ticklish", while touching her "below the bra line" on her stomach. He had been charged twice for battery, in 2012 and 2016, where he was accused of grabbing a woman's buttocks in both situations.

YouTube videos posted by Beierle in 2014 showed that he identified with the involuntary celibate community while often complaining about  his sexual rejections from women. He also sympathized with the shooter behind the 2014 Isla Vista killings, Elliot Rodger, as he too felt lonely and unloved as well as posting misogynistic songs on SoundCloud. Other videos depicted him ranting about African-Americans, illegal immigration and interracial relationships. One of the videos was named "Dangers of Diversity".

The FBI and the Tallahassee Police Department attested to Beierle's hatred of women, saying he was "disturbed" during the shooting.  They further noted he had planned the attack months in advance. The International Centre for Counter-Terrorism lists the attack as an act of misogynist terrorism.

Aftermath 
Florida State University held a vigil for the victims of the shooting on November 4, while another series of tributes were planned for November 5 with the help of Tallahassee's Delta Delta Delta sorority chapter, of which victim Maura Binkley was a member. Other tributes were published by the deceased's families and friends  through social media. On November 11, a candlelit vigil was held at Cascades Park. The day after the shooting, a yoga instructor of Hot Yoga Tallahassee led a yoga class for healing in the middle of Adams Street. In 2019, Binkley's parents sued the yoga studio and property owner claiming both were negligent in providing adequate safety.

In 2022 the Secret Service's National Threat Assessment Center released a detailed case study of the shooting. The report says the attacker is typical of misogynist extremism or male supremacist violence. He was arrested for groping women, wrote violent songs about torturing women, and admired other mass killers who targeted women.

References

2018 active shooter incidents in the United States
2018 crimes in Florida
2018 mass shootings in the United States
2018 murders in the United States
History of Tallahassee, Florida
Incel-related violence
Incidents of violence against women
Mass shootings in Florida
Tallahassee
Murder in Florida
Murder–suicides in Florida
November 2018 crimes in the United States